Jean-Pol Martin (born 1943, Paris, France) studied teacher education for foreign language teachers in Germany, and developed a teaching method called learning by teaching.  He spent most of his career at Catholic University of Eichstätt-Ingolstadt and was a Professor there when he retired in 2008.

Biography
Martin was born in 1943 in Paris and went to Germany in 1968. He studied German and French in order to become a teacher at a German grammar school, and also became an instructor in teacher education at the Catholic University of Eichstätt-Ingolstadt (Bavaria) in 1980.

He earned his undergraduate degree at Paris Nanterre University in 1969, then studied German and Romance languages at University of Erlangen–Nuremberg from 1969 to 1975, then worked as a trainee teacher in French language from 1975 to 1977 at Albrecht Dürer Gymnasium in Nürnberg. He then taught French and German at the Gymnasium Höchstadt/Aisch from 1977 to 1980.  

In 1980 he started working at Catholic University of Eichstätt-Ingolstadt, training French teachers. Simultaneously he studied language acquisition and pedagogy at Justus Liebig University Giessen, and earned his Ph.D. there in 1985. His thesis on "Didactics of the French Language and Literature" was accepted in 1985. In 1994, after his Habilitation, he was appointed Privatdozent at Catholic University of Eichstätt and in 2000 he was appointed Professor.

He established the learning by teaching method for students to learn by teaching their peers. The method became widely used in Germany in secondary education, and in the 1990s it was further formalized and began to be used in universities as well, and has spread to other disciplines and other countries.  

By 2008 Martin had retired, and although he remained active Joachim Grzega took the lead in developing and promulgating LdL.

Books

References

External links
Jean-Pol Martin at Google Scholar
Lernen durch Lehren website
Autobiography at Wikiversity (German)
Academic influence
Jean-Pol Martin - English Language Teacher Interview #16, ELT Under The Covers Podcast, 2022

German educational theorists
20th-century educational theorists
1943 births
Living people
Academic staff of the Catholic University of Eichstätt-Ingolstadt